Debdeb is a town and commune in In Amenas District, Illizi Province, Algeria. According to the 2008 census it has a population of 4,341, up from 3,212 in 1998, and an annual population growth rate of 3.1%, the lowest in the province. Its postal code is 33220 and its municipal code is 3303.

Geography

Debdeb lies at an altitude of  near the northern edge of the Hamada de Tinrhert, a large rocky area of the Sahara around the border of Algeria and Libya. The Grand Erg Oriental, a vast area of sand dunes, lies to the north.

Climate

Debdeb has a hot desert climate (Köppen climate classification BWh), with extremely hot summers and mild winters, and very little precipitation throughout the year.

Transportation

Debdeb is on the national highway N53, which leads north to Ghadames (in Libya) and south to In Amenas.

Education

4.0% of the population has a tertiary education, and another 13.2% has completed secondary education. The overall literacy rate is 71.8%, and is 79.9% among males and 63.0% among females.

Localities
The commune is composed of seven localities:
Debdeb
Aïn Sabri
Fort Saint
Stah
Merixen
Alrar Erg
Yagous

References

Neighbouring towns and cities

In Amenas District
Tuareg
Communes of Illizi Province
Illizi Province